Kallstroemia californica is a species of flowering plant in the caltrop family known by the common name California caltrop. It is native to the deserts of the Southwestern United States, California, and northern Mexico.

Description
Kallstroemia californica is a mat-forming annual herb which grows in thick carpetlike masses on sandy substrates. The branching stem has compound leaves which are each made up of several widely spaced pairs of small oval-shaped green leaflets.

It produces individual flowers with five rounded or oval petals and a ring of ten stamens. The fruit is a small body a few millimeters wide of ten conjoined nutlets which split apart.

External links
Calflora Database: Kallstroemia californica (California caltrop,  California kallstroemia)
Jepson Manual eFlora treatment - Kallstroemia californica
Kallstroemia californica - Photo gallery

californica
Flora of Northwestern Mexico
Flora of the Southwestern United States
Flora of the California desert regions
Flora of the Sonoran Deserts
Natural history of the Colorado Desert
Natural history of the Mojave Desert
Taxa named by Sereno Watson
Flora without expected TNC conservation status